Logan Frank Hensley (February 16, 1900 – November 4, 1971), nicknamed "Slap", was an American Negro league pitcher in the 1920s and 1930s.

A native of Pacific, Missouri, Hensley made his Negro leagues debut in 1922 with the St. Louis Stars, and played the majority of his career with the club. He was credited with a win and a loss in 18 innings pitched in the Stars' 1928 Negro National League championship series victory over the Chicago American Giants. Hensley died in Kansas City, Missouri in 1971 at age 71.

References

External links
 and Baseball-Reference Black Baseball stats and Seamheads

1900 births
1971 deaths
Cleveland Browns (baseball) players
Cleveland Tate Stars players
Chicago American Giants players
Indianapolis ABCs (1931–1933) players
St. Louis Stars (baseball) players
St. Louis Giants (1924) players
Toledo Tigers players
Baseball pitchers
Baseball players from Missouri
20th-century African-American sportspeople